When the Bough Breaks is a mystery novel by Jonathan Kellerman.  It is the first novel in the Alex Delaware series.

Plot introduction
Dr. Morton Hander practiced a strange brand of psychiatry.  Among his specialties were fraud, extortion and sexual manipulation.  Hander paid for his sins when he was brutally murdered in his luxurious Pacific Palisades apartment.  The police have no leads, but they do have one possible witness: seven-year-old Melody Quinn.

It's psychologist Dr. Alex Delaware's job to try to unlock the terrible secret buried in Melody's memory.  But as the sinister shadows in the girl's mind begin to take shape, Alex discovers that the mystery touches a shocking incident in his own past.  And behind it lies an unspeakable evil that Alex Delaware must expose before it claims another innocent victim.

Characters
Alex Delaware - Psychologist
Milo Sturgis - Police detective
Dr. Morton Hander - Psychiatrist and murder victim
Melody Quinn - Delaware's patient and murder witness

Awards
 1986 Anthony award, Best First novel
 1986 Edgar Award, Best First novel by An American Author

Adaptations

The novel was adapted for a 1986 television film, also titled When the Bough Breaks, co-produced by and starring Ted Danson as Alex Delaware and Richard Masur as Milo Sturgis.

References

1985 American novels
Novels by Jonathan Kellerman
Anthony Award-winning works
American novels adapted into films
1985 debut novels